Helicoverpa fletcheri is a species of moth of the family Noctuidae that is found in Africa, including Sudan.

It is considered a minor pest on Sesamum indicum.

External links
New Records of Helicoverpa fletcheri Hardwick from the Sudan Gezira and Observations on Diapause in the American Bollworm
Sesamum indicum info, including pest species

fletcheri
Moths described in 1965
Moths of Africa